Jodłowiec  is a village in the administrative district of Gmina Wieluń, within Wieluń County, Łódź Voivodeship, in central Poland. It lies approximately  East of Wieluń and  South-West of the regional capital Łódź.

References

Villages in Wieluń County